Murtadha Al-Burayh (born 10 July 1990) is a Saudi professional footballer who plays as a centre back for Pro League club Al-Adalah. 

His part-time work is  events MC whe didn't play for Al-Adalah.￼

Career
Al-Burayh started his career with Al-Ettifaq where he was promoted from the youth team to the first team. On 24 July 2013, he joined First Division side Al-Khaleej on a season-long loan. After 5 years with Al-Ettifaq, Al-Burayh left the club and signed with Al-Watani on 15 July 2017. After Al-Watani's relegation to the Second Division, Al-Burayh joined newly promoted First Division side Al-Adalah. After just a season with the club, Al-Burayh helped Al-Adalah reach the Pro League, the top tier of Saudi football, for the first time in the club's history.

References

External links 
 

1990 births
Living people
Saudi Arabian footballers
Ettifaq FC players
Khaleej FC players
Al-Watani Club players
Al-Adalah FC players
Association football defenders
Saudi First Division League players
Saudi Professional League players
Saudi Arabian Shia Muslims